Axiocerses susanae is a butterfly in the family Lycaenidae. It is found in Zimbabwe.

Adults have been recorded in March.

The larvae feed on Peltophorum africanum, Pterolobium stellatum, Julbernardia globiflora and Schotia brachypetala. They are associated with the ant species Pheidole megacephala.

References

Butterflies described in 1996
Axiocerses
Endemic fauna of Zimbabwe
Butterflies of Africa